PAWB may refer to
PAWB (People Against Wylfa-B), a protest movement against the expansion of Wylfa Nuclear Power Station 
Beaver Airport, Alaska, ICAO-code PAWB